Newbliss, historically known as Lisdaragh, is a village and townland in County Monaghan, Ireland. The village is located where the R183 and R189 regional roads intersect.

Transport
Rail services do not serve Newbliss, as Newbliss railway station (which opened in 1855) was closed for passenger traffic on 14 October 1957, and closed altogether on 1 January 1960.

See also
 List of towns and villages in the Republic of Ireland
 Market Houses in the Republic of Ireland

References

Towns and villages in County Monaghan
Townlands of County Monaghan